Mr. C is the moniker for British DJ, music producer and rapper Richard West.

Mr. C may also refer to:

People 
 Mr. C The Slide Man, an alias of American DJ and songwriter DJ Casper
 Mr. C, a nickname of American singer Perry Como

Characters 
 Mr. C, the nickname of Howard Cunningham, a starring character on the TV series Happy Days
 Mr. C, the nickname of Gordon Cunningham, a character on the TV soap opera Hollyoaks
 Mr. C, a character representing the letter C from the children's television series The Letter People
 Mr. C, the mascot of the Vanderbilt University Commodores
 Mr. C, one of two doppelgängers of Dale Cooper featured in Twin Peaks: The Return

See also 
 Mr. Cee (born 1966), American Hip Hop DJ
 MR-C (Modular Rifle - Caseless), a mockup of an assault rifle
 C (disambiguation)
 MRC (disambiguation)